Roger Le Moine  (6 November 1933, La Malbaie – 12 July 2004, Ottawa) was an emeritus professor of Québec and French literature at the University of Ottawa.

Biography 
After growing up in La Malbaie, Le Moine briefly studied law before opting for literature (doctorate in 1970). As a professor, he specialized in European exotic literature, freemasonry, and, more importantly, participated in the rediscovery of Québec's 18th and 19th century literature.

He was elected at the Société des Dix (1988) and of the Royal Society of Canada (1993).

He is the nephew of writers James MacPherson Le Moine, Arthur Buies, Félix-Antoine Savard and of the painter Edmond Le Moine.

Bibliography

Books
Joseph Marmette, sa vie, son œuvre, Québec, Presses de l'Université Laval, 1968.
Napoléon Bourassa, l'homme et l'artiste, Ottawa, éditions de l'Université d'Ottawa, 1974.
Le Catalogue de la bibliothèque de Louis-Joseph Papineau, Ottawa, 1982.
Un Québécois bien tranquille, Québec, La Liberté, 1985.
Deux loges montréalaises du Grand Orient de France, Ottawa, Presses de l'Université d'Ottawa, 1991.
L'Aventure des Lettres : pour Roger Le Moine, Michel Gaulin, Ottawa, Éditions David, 1999.

Text edition
Joseph Marmette, textes choisis (...), Montréal, Fides, 1969.
L'Amérique et les poètes français de la Renaissance, Ottawa, 1972.
Napoléon Bourassa, textes choisis (...), Montréal, Fides, 1972.
Laure Conan, œuvres romanesques, Montréal, Fides, 1974–1975, 3 vol.
Napoléon Bourassa, Jacques et Marie. Souvenir d'un peuple dispersé, Montréal, Fides, 1976.
Honoré Beaugrand, Jeanne la fileuse, Montréal, Fides, 1980.
La région de La Malbaie (1535-1760), La Malbaie, 1983.
Louise-Amélie Panet, Ottawa, éditions David, 2000.

Selected articles
"Le roman historique au Canada français, Le roman canadien-français". Évolution - Témoignages - Bibliographie, Montréal, Fides, 1964, p. 69-87.
"L'abbé Casgrain et le tombeau de Champlain", Revue de l'Université d'Ottawa, vol. 35, numéro4 (octobre-décembre 1965), p. 399-419.
"Le Club des Dix à Ottawa", Revue de l'Université Laval, vol. 20, numéro8 (avril 1966), p. 703-709.
"Laure Conan et Pierre-Alexis Tremblay", Revue de l'Université d'Ottawa, vol. 37, numéro2 (avril-juin 1966), p. 258-271 et vol. 37, numéro3 (juillet-septembre 1966), p. 500-528.
"La première immigration française au Québec", La découverte de l'Amérique, Paris, Vrin, 1968, p. 127-156 (cours donné au Dixième stage international d'études humanistes, Université de Tours, 1966).
"Un seigneur éclairé, Louis-Joseph Papineau", Revue d'histoire de l'Amérique française, vol. 25, numéro 3 (décembre 1971), p. 309-336.
"L'École littéraire de Québec, un mythe de la critique", Livres et auteurs québécois 1972, Montréal, Éditions Jumonville, 1973, p. 397-413.
"Le roman historique québécois (1837-1925)", Le roman Canadien-français. Évolution - Témoignages - Bibliographie, 3e édition, Montréal, Fides, 1977, p. 69-88.
"La bibliothèque de Louis-Joseph Papineau", Bulletin de la Bibliothèque nationale du Québec, décembre 1977, p. 12-13.
"Le catalogue de la bibliothèque de Louis-Joseph Papineau", L'imprimé au Québec. Aspects historiques (18e - 20e siècle), sous la direction de Yvan Lamonde, Québec, Institut québécois de recherche sur la culture, 1983, p. 167-188.
"Le roman au s-|XIX|e", Le Québécois et sa littérature, sous la direction de René Dionne, Sherbrooke, Éditions Naaman/Agence de Coopération Culturelle et Technique, 1984, p. 76-84.
"Le sang bleu de Menaud", Cultures du Canada français, vol. 1 (1984), p. 11-32.
"Lucon fictif, Lucon réel", Solitude rompue, Ottawa, Éditions de l'Université d'Ottawa (coll. Cahiers du Centre de recherche en civilisation canadienne-française, numéro23), 1986, p. 234-247.
"Daniel Poliquin: un recueil de nouvelles et deux romans", Vie française, vol. 40, numéro 1 (décembre 1988), p. 77-82.
"En conjuguant mon plus-que-passé", Mémoires de la Société généalogique canadienne-française, vol. 41, numéro1 (printemps 1990), p. 5-28.
"L'épopée abandonnée de Félix-Antoine Savard", Mélanges de littérature canadienne-française et québécoise offerts à Réjean Robidoux, Textes réunis par Yolande Grisé et Robert Major, Ottawa, Les Presses de l'Université d'Ottawa (coll. Cahiers du Centre de recherche en civilisation canadienne-française, numéro29), 1992, p. 134-151.
"Francs-maçons du régime français et de la Province of Québec", Principes du littéraire au Québec (1760–1815), Montréal, Université du Québec à Montréal, (coll. Cahiers de l'Archéologie du littéraire au Québec, numéro 2), 1993, p. 17-33.
"Premiers rapports à la littérature", L'Info-Lettres, vol. 7, numéro1 (hiver 1995), p. 8-11; Présentations à la Société royale du Canada, vol. 48 (1995), p. 5-11, (discours de réception à la Société royale du Canada, le 14 octobre 1994).
Préface à Réjean Robidoux, Fonder une littérature nationale, Ottawa, Les Éditions David, 1994, p. IX-XI.
"Le Grand Orient de France dans le contexte québécois (1896-1923)", Combats libéraux au tournant du s-|XX|e, sous la direction de Yvan Lamonde, Montréal, Fides, 1995, p. 145-157.
"L'aventure mexicaine de quelques québécois (1864-1867)", Les discours du Nouveau Monde au s-|XIX|e au Canada français et en Amérique latine/Los discursos del Nuevo Mundo en el siglo XIX en el Canadá francófono y en América Latina, sous la direction de Marie Couillard et Patrick Imbert, Brooklyn/Ottawa/Toronto, Legas, 1995, p. 253-262.
 Philomène Aubert de Gaspé (1837-1872). Ébauche d'une biographie , Questions d'histoire littéraire. Mélanges offerts à Maurice Lemire, sous la direction de Aurélien Boivin, Gilles Dorion et Kenneth Landry, Québec, Nuit blanche, 1996, p. 95-106.
 Philippe Aubert de Gaspé ou les affaires du bon gentilhomme , Les Cahiers des Dix, vol. 57, 2004, pp. 299–323.

1933 births
2004 deaths
Academic staff of the University of Ottawa
Fellows of the Royal Society of Canada